M was a virtual assistant by Facebook, first announced in August 2015, that could automatically complete tasks for users, such as purchase items, arrange gift deliveries, reserve restaurant tables, and arrange travel. By April 2017, it was available to about 10,000 users. It worked inside the Facebook Messenger instant messaging service.

If a user made a request for M, it uses algorithms to determine what the user wants. If M did not understand, a human takes over the conversation, unbeknownst to the user. This allows M to learn. 

Alex Lebrun ran the project, which began in 2015, and which in April 2017 the MIT Technology Review called "successful".

In January 2018, Facebook announced that they would be discontinuing M. The company stated that what they learned from M would be applied to other artificial intelligence projects at Facebook.

Rollout of suggestions
In April 2017, Facebook enabled suggestions, powered by M, for users in the United States. M scans chats for keywords and then suggests relevant actions. For example, a user writing "You owe me $20" to a friend triggers M to enable the user's friend to pay the user via Facebook's payment platform.

See also 
 Google Assistant
 Clova (virtual assistant)

References

Virtual assistants
Natural language processing software
Webcams
Messenger (software)
Discontinued software